State roads in New Mexico, along with the Interstate Highway System, and the United States Numbered Highway System, fall under the jurisdiction of the New Mexico Department of Transportation (NMDOT). The U.S. state of New Mexico has 412 state roads, totaling  that criss-cross the 33 counties of the state. Most highway numbers are one, two, or three digits long, however there are three highways that have four digit highway numbers. These highways are New Mexico State Road 1113 (NM 1113), NM 5001, and NM 6563.

The shortest, NM 446, is a quarter-mile (402 m) long and serves to connect Valmora to NM 97. NM 597, the second shortest highway, links U.S. Route 160 (US 160) to the Four Corners Monument, a tourist destination on the Navajo Nation where the states of Utah, Arizona, New Mexico, and Colorado meet.

Route log

See also

Footnotes

References

External links 
New Mexico Highways

State Highways
Transportation in New Mexico